Laramie Mountains is a 1952 American Western film directed by Ray Nazarro and starring Charles Starrett, Jock Mahoney and Fred F. Sears. It is part of the Durango Kid series.

The film's sets were designed by the art director Charles Clague.

Cast
 Charles Starrett as Steve Holden / The Durango Kid 
 Jock Mahoney as Swift Eagle 
 Fred F. Sears as Major Markham 
 Marshall Reed as Lieutenant Robert Pierce 
 Rory Mallinson as Paul Drake - Henchman, aka Bill Turner 
 Zon Murray as Carson - Henchman 
 Smiley Burnette as Sergeant Smiley Burnette 
 Chris Alcaide as Jeff - Henchman 
 Frank McCarroll as Soldier 
 Boyd 'Red' Morgan as Cruller - Henchman 
 Charles Soldani as Indian With Swift Eagle 
 Boyd Stockman as Corporal 
 John War Eagle as Chief Lone Tree 
 Robert J. Wilke as Henry Mandel

References

Bibliography
 Pitts, Michael R. Western Movies: A Guide to 5,105 Feature Films. McFarland, 2012.

External links
 

1952 films
1952 Western (genre) films
1950s English-language films
American Western (genre) films
Films directed by Ray Nazarro
Columbia Pictures films
American black-and-white films
1950s American films